John Anders Gaustad (born February 29, 1980) is a Norwegian cross-country skier who has competed since 2001. His best World Cup finish was fifth in a 15 km event in Norway in November 2009.

Cross-country skiing results
All results are sourced from the International Ski Federation (FIS).

World Cup

Season standings

References

External links

1980 births
Living people
Norwegian male cross-country skiers